Grosvenor Square  is a Victorian square located in the inner suburb of Rathmines on the Southside of Dublin. While construction of the houses commenced in the late 1850s, it continued on a piecemeal basis for the next four decades. The square was finally completed in the beginning of the 20th century. 

The housing on the square is generally more modest in size and design than the nearby Kenilworth Square. Located in the central green of the square are Kenilworth Bowling Club and Stratford Lawn Tennis Club. Leinster Cricket Club originally played matches in the square before moving to Observatory Lane in 1865. Grosvenor Park, Grosvenor Lane, Grosvenor Place and Grosvenor Road are also located near the square in both Rathmines and nearby Rathgar.

Notable residents
Albert Russell Nichols
Ella Young
Rex Ingram (director)

References 

Squares in Dublin (city)